Musa Isayevich Ibragimov (born 28 May 1996) is a Russian football player for Peresvet Domodedovo.

Club career
He made his debut in the Russian Football National League for FC Yenisey Krasnoyarsk on 12 March 2016 in a game against FC Baikal Irkutsk and scored on his debut.

References

External links
 Profile by Russian Football National League
 
 
 Profile at Crimean Football Union

1996 births
Sportspeople from Krasnoyarsk
Living people
Russian footballers
Azerbaijani footballers
Association football midfielders
Russian expatriate footballers
Russian sportspeople of Azerbaijani descent
Azerbaijani expatriate footballers
Expatriate footballers in Belarus
Expatriate footballers in Tajikistan
Crimean Premier League players
FC Yenisey Krasnoyarsk players
FC Volna Pinsk players
FC Khimik Svetlogorsk players
FC Nosta Novotroitsk players
FC Kyzyltash Bakhchisaray players